Sydowiellaceae is family of fungi in the order Diaporthales.

Genera
As accepted by GBIF;
 Alborbis  (2)
 Breviappendix  (5)
 Cainiella  
 Caudospora   (3)
 Chapeckia  (3)
 Hapalocystis  (7)
 Italiomyces  (3)
 Lambro  (2)
 Paragnomonia  (1)
 Ranulospora  (3)
 Rossmania  (2)
 Sillia  (9)
 Stegophora  (3)
 Sydowiella  (9)
 Tenuiappendicula  (2)
 Tortilispora (4)
 Tunstallia  (1)
 Uleoporthe  (1)

Figures in brackets are approx. how many species per genus.

References

External links

Fungal plant pathogens and diseases
Diaporthales
Ascomycota families